Holly Farrar was an American football player and coach. He served as a player-coach for Otterbein University in Westerville, Ohio in 1894. He served as the head football coach at Ohio Wesleyan University, along with Oscar Scott, the following year in 1895.

References

Year of birth missing
Year of death missing
19th-century players of American football
Player-coaches
American football fullbacks
Ohio Wesleyan Battling Bishops football coaches
Ohio Wesleyan Battling Bishops football players
Otterbein Cardinals football coaches